The 2008–09 Northern Iowa Panthers men's basketball team represents University of Northern Iowa in the 2008-09 NCAA Division I men's basketball season. The team, which plays in the Missouri Valley Conference (MVC), is led by third-year head coach Ben Jacobson. In 2007–08, the Panthers finished 18–14 (9–9 in the MVC).

Pre-season 
Northern Iowa played two games during the preseason. They faced Dubuque and Wayne State at home.

Regular season 
On January 31, 2009 the Panthers tied a school record for the most consecutive wins with a 61–57 victory over Indians State. The record tied the 1963–1964 State College of Iowa Panthers team. On February 2, 2008 Northern Iowa received 1 point in the AP Top 25 poll which had them ranked 45th. On March 9, 2008 Northern Iowa received 3 points in the AP Top 25 poll which had them ranked T-37th.

Roster

Schedule

References 

Northern Iowa
Northern Iowa Panthers men's basketball seasons
Northern Iowa
Panth
Panth